Kamuthi taluk is a taluk of Ramanathapuram district of the Indian state of Tamil Nadu. The headquarters of the taluk is the town of Kamuthi.

Demographics
According to the 2011 census, the taluk of Kamuthi had a population of 135,660 with 68,600  males and 67,060 females. There were 978 women for every 1000 men. The taluk had a literacy rate of 70.12. Child population in the age group below 6 was 7,070 Males and 6,770 Females.

References 

Taluks of Ramanathapuram district